Vasota Fort (also called Vyaghragad (व्याघ्रगड)) is located in Satara district in the Indian state of Maharashtra.

History
It was famously defended by Tai Telin a mistress of Pant Pratinidhi a killedar of the fort when he was captured.

Vasota fort is attributed to the Kolhapur Shilahara Chief Bhoja II (1178–1193) of Panhala. Vasota always remained with Marathas, Shirkes & Mores in 16th century. 

Shivaji Maharaj incorporated the fort into Swarajya in 1655 during the conquest of Javli. Shivaji Maharaj renamed the fort "Vyaghragad" (Vyaghra – means tiger), owing to its difficult natural defense.

In 1818 the British bombarded the fort with heavy artillery, destroying many buildings on Vasota (Chandika mandir, Daru-kothar, etc.) and looted property worth 5 lakhs.

Places to see
The fort is in dilapidated condition and is overgrown. The remnants of Shree Mahadev mandir and the plinth of a huge "sadar" (discussion place) are there. It is a protected natural reserve.

Location
Vasota Fort is located about  70 km from satara near Bamnoli village on the banks of Shivsagar lake.

See also
Vasota Fort Info
Vasota trek notes -- Roop Mallik
 List of forts in Maharashtra

References

Forts in Satara district